Chuniophoenix hainanensis, also known as Hainan fan palm,  is a species of palm tree. It is endemic to China.

References

Chuniophoenix
Endemic flora of China
Endangered plants
Taxonomy articles created by Polbot
Plants described in 1937
Taxa named by Max Burret